Oto Brunegraf (born 7 July 1972) is a Slovak football manager. His last spell was with the Slovak national team as an assistant to Pavel Hapal with whom he also served on club level in Slovakia, Czech Republic and Poland. He managed the side for one match on caretaker basis in a 2–3 defeat versus Israel.

External links

References

1972 births
Living people
Sportspeople from Nitra
Slovak football managers
Slovakia national under-21 football team managers